Rabbi Shlomo Zalman Porush,,  was born in Babruysk, Russian Empire (now Belarus) in 1850 to his father Rabbi Naftali Zvi Porush (d. 1866) and mother Leah (d. 1900). He died in Jerusalem in 1898 and is buried on the Mount of Olives.

Biography
He arrived in Eretz Yisroel as a boy in 1860 together with his parents and a brother Gershon and a sister. As a Jerusalem community leader of the Yishuv haYashan he created the Shaarei Chesed Free-Loan Fund, the first of its kind in Jerusalem, which he directed on a voluntary basis for 18 years. After his death the organization founded the neighborhood of Shaarei Chesed.

Some of his children were also leaders of the Yishuv haYashan. His children were: Rabbi Naftali Zvi Porush (the second), Rabbi Akiva Porush, Rabbi Aaron Porush, Rabbi Eliezer Lipa (Lipman) Porush, Rabbi Liber Mordechai Porush. A daughter married his brother Gershon's son Rabbi Menachem Mendel Porush. Another daughter Tzivia married Rabbi Chaim Yehuda Leib Auerbach and their son was Rabbi Shlomo Zalman Auerbach who was named after him.

1850 births
1898 deaths
People from Babruysk
Belarusian Orthodox rabbis
19th-century rabbis in Jerusalem
Burials at the Jewish cemetery on the Mount of Olives
Emigrants from the Russian Empire to the Ottoman Empire
Ashkenazi rabbis in Ottoman Palestine